Football at the Pochonbo Torch Prize Sports Games is an annual association football men's competition in Multi-sport event – Pochonbo Torch Prize Sports Games in North Korea, organised by the DPR Korea Football Association.

Results

Performance by club

References 

The Chosun Jørn: Can Jørn Andersen Make Sense of North Korean Football?

  
2005 establishments in North Korea